Rosasite is a carbonate mineral with minor potential for use as a zinc and copper ore. Chemically, it is a copper zinc carbonate hydroxide with a copper to zinc ratio of 3:2, occurring in the secondary oxidation zone of copper-zinc deposits. It was originally discovered in 1908 in the Rosas mine in Sardinia, Italy, and is named after the location. Fibrous blue-green rosasite crystals are usually found in globular aggregates, often associated with red limonite and other colorful minerals. It is very similar to aurichalcite, but can be distinguished by its superior hardness.

References

Mineral galleries

Copper(II) minerals
Zinc minerals
Carbonate minerals
Monoclinic minerals
Minerals in space group 14
Minerals described in 1908